New Milford, also called Rootstown Station, is an unincorporated area in Portage County, Ohio, United States. It is located in eastern Rootstown Township, immediately south of Interstate 76.

History
A post office called New Milford was established in 1857, and remained in operation until 1967. Besides the post office, New Milford had a railroad station and a gristmill.

References

Unincorporated communities in Portage County, Ohio
1857 establishments in Ohio
Populated places established in 1857
Unincorporated communities in Ohio